Xavier Delamare is the former regional leader of Scientology for the South Eastern portion of France.  He was convicted of fraud on November 15, 1999, and jailed.  He received an eighteen-month sentence, "while four other members accused of fraud, violence and illegally practicing medicine were given suspended sentences of six months to a year".

References

External links
http://www.guardian.co.uk/international/story/0,,252616,00.html

French religious leaders
French fraudsters
French Scientologists
French prisoners and detainees
Prisoners and detainees of France
Living people
Year of birth missing (living people)